The Twente goose is a rare breed of domestic goose from the Twente region of the Netherlands.

History

In 1900, Twente geese numbered more than 100,000; in 2011 the population was reported as 110. There are fewer than 20 breeders.

Characteristics
The plumage may be either white or pied grey and white. Twente ganders usually weigh , and geese .

References

Goose breeds originating in the Netherlands
Goose breeds